Stanley Tucci is an American actor and filmmaker. Tucci is known for his performances in film, television and theatre.

Film

Television

Video games

Theatre

Source: Playbill and Internet Broadway Database

References

External links
 

Male actor filmographies
American filmographies